The South Coast League, along with the Sea View League in Orange County, California, make up the ten member high schools of the Coast View Athletic Association, which is part of the California Interscholastic Federation's Southern Section (CIF Southern Section). For the 2017-18 academic year, the member schools of the South Coast League are:

 Baseball
 Capistrano Valley
 Dana Hills
El Toro
 Mission Viejo
 Tesoro
 Basketball, Boys
 Aliso Niguel
 Capistrano Valley
 Mission Viejo
San Clemente
 Trabuco Hills
 Basketball, Girls
 Aliso Niguel
 Dana Hills
 San Clemente
 Tesoro
Trabuco Hills
 Cross Country, Boys
 Alison Niguel
Dana Hills
 El Toro
 Mission Viejo
 San Juan Hills
 Cross Country, Girls
 Capistrano Valley
 Dana Hills
 El Toro
Mission Viejo
 Trabuco Hills
 Football (11 man)
San Juan Hills 
Mission Viejo
 San Clemente
 Tesoro
 Golf, Boys
 Capistrano Valley
 Dana Hills
 Mission Viejo
 San Clemente
 Tesoro
 Golf, Girls
 ALiso Niguel
Dana Hills
 San Clemente
 San Juan Hills
Trabuco Hills
 Lacrosse, Boys
 El Toro
Mission Viejo
 San Clemente
Tesoro
 Trabuco Hills
 Lacrosse, Girls
 Aliso Niguel
 San Clemente
 San Juan Hills
 Tesoro
 Trabuco Hills
 Soccer, Boys
 Capistrano Valley
 El Toro
 Mission Viejo
 San Clemente
 San Juan Hills
 Soccer, Girls
 Aliso Niguel
 Dana Hills
 San Clemente
 San Juan Hills
Tesoro
 Softball
 Aliso Niguel
 Dana Hills
 Laguna Hills
 Mission Viejo
 San Juan Hills
 Swimming & Diving, Boys
 Aliso Niguel
 Dana Hills
 Laguna Hills
 San Clemente
Tesoro
 Swimming & Diving, Girls
 Aliso Niguel
 Dana Hills
 Laguna Hills
 San Clemente
Tesoro
 Tennis, Boys
 Aliso Niguel
Dana Hills
 El Toro
San Clemente
 Tesoro
 Tennis, Girls
 Aliso Niguel
 Capistrano Valley
Dana Hills
 San Clemente
 Tesoro
 Track & Field, Boys
 Aliso Niguel
Dana Hills
 El Toro
Mission Viejo
 Trabuco Hills
 Track & Field, Girls
 Aliso Niguel
Dana Hills
 El Toro
Mission Viejo
 Trabuco Hills
 Volleyball, Boys
 Aliso Niguel
 Dana Hills
 San Clemente
 Tesoro
Trabuco Hills
 Volleyball, Girls
 Aliso Niguel
 Dana Hills
El Toro
San Juan Hills
 Trabuco Hills
 Water Polo, Boys
 Dana Hills
 El Toro
 San Clemente
San Juan Hills
Tesoro
 Water Polo, Girls
 Aliso Niguel
Dana Hills
 El Toro
 San Clemente
 Trabuco Hills
 Wrestling
 Aliso Niguel
 Dana Hills
El Toro
 Laguna Hills
 Trabuco Hills
 Wrestling, Girls
 Aliso Niguel
 Dana Hills
 El Toro
Laguna Hills
 Trabuco Hills

Football
As of 2022-23, the football membership of the league consists of:
Capistrano Valley High School
Mission Viejo High School
San Clemente High School	
Tesoro High School

Athletic league officers[edit] 
The South Coast League is an athletic conference made up of similar schools located in Orange County, California.

 President: Terri Gusiff, Principal, El Toro High School
 Secretary: Chad Addison, Athletic Director, Capistrano Valley High School
 League Coordinator: Armando Rivas, Athletic Director, El Toro High School
 Compliance Officer: Andrew Mashburn, Athletic Director, Aliso Niguel High School
 Counsel Representative: Chris Carter, Principal, San Clemente Hills High School

References 

CIF Southern Section leagues